The 1932 Humboldt State Lumberjacks football team represented Humboldt State College during the 1932 college football season. They competed as an independent.

The 1932 Lumberjacks were led by sixth-year head coach Fred Telonicher. They played home games at Albee Stadium in Eureka, California. Humboldt State finished with a record of one win and four losses (1–4). The Lumberjacks were outscored by their opponents 32–96 for the season.

Schedule

Notes

References

Humboldt State
Humboldt State Lumberjacks football seasons
Humboldt State Lumberjacks football